Emmanuel Kakoko Etepé (born 22 November 1950) is a Congolese former professional footballer who played as a forward. He represented Zaire in the 1974 FIFA World Cup.

Career
Kakoko played for Imana Kinshasa, VfB Stuttgart (1981–82) and 1. FC Saarbrücken. Kakoko finished fourth in the voting for France Football's 1973 African Player of the Year. In 2006, he was selected by CAF as one of the best 200 African football players of the last 50 years.

Personal life
His son Yannick is also a footballer.

See also
 1974 FIFA World Cup squads

References

External links
 
 

1950 births
Living people
Footballers from Kinshasa
Democratic Republic of the Congo footballers
Association football forwards
Democratic Republic of the Congo international footballers
Africa Cup of Nations-winning players
1974 FIFA World Cup players
1970 African Cup of Nations players
1972 African Cup of Nations players
1974 African Cup of Nations players
1976 African Cup of Nations players
Daring Club Motema Pembe players
VfB Stuttgart players
1. FC Saarbrücken players
Borussia Neunkirchen players
Bundesliga players
2. Bundesliga players
Democratic Republic of the Congo expatriate footballers
Democratic Republic of the Congo expatriate sportspeople in Germany
Expatriate footballers in Germany
21st-century Democratic Republic of the Congo people